The Crooked Snake (1955) is the first novel by Australian author Patricia Wrightson. The book was illustrated by Margaret Horder. It won the Children's Book of the Year Award: Older Readers in 1956.'''

Plot outline

A gang of children form a secret society to protect a nearby national park from vandals.  They record the bush with a camera and write to the Ministry of Conservation requesting the park be designated a flora and fauna sanctuary.

Critical reception

In a survey of Australian children's books dealing with the Australian bush, Susan Sheridan and Emma Maguire noted: "In their preferred method of research, and in their dealings with the bureaucracy, these children mark out a specifically modern, as well as Australian, mode of the Enid Blyton or Arthur Ransome adventure story in a natural setting."

See also

 1955 in Australian literature

References

Australian children's novels
Novels by Patricia Wrightson
1955 Australian novels
Novels set in Australia
CBCA Children's Book of the Year Award-winning works
1955 children's books
Angus & Robertson books